M. R. Lakshmi Narayanan was an Indian politician and former Member of Parliament elected from Tamil Nadu. He was elected to the Lok Sabha from Tindivanam constituency as an Indian National Congress candidate in 1971 and 1977 elections.

Early life
M. R. Lakshmi Narayanan was born in Reddiar family in Cuddalore.

Political career
M. R. Lakshmi Narayanan joined the congress party and contested in the 1971 general elections. He won in the 1971 elections and represented Tindivanam in the Lok Sabha. Then he also contested in the 1977 general elections and represented Tindivanam again.

Personal life
M. R. Lakshmi Narayanan married Saraswathy and had one daughter.

References 

Indian National Congress politicians from Tamil Nadu
Living people
India MPs 1971–1977
India MPs 1977–1979
Lok Sabha members from Tamil Nadu
People from Cuddalore district
People from Viluppuram district
Year of birth missing (living people)